Events from the year 1676 in Denmark.

Incumbents
 Monarch – Christian V
 Grand Chancellor – Frederik Ahlefeldt

Events

 11 March – Peder Griffenfeld is arrested at Copenhagen Castle and brought to Kastellet where he is imprisoned.
 8 May – Dutchman Cornelis Tromp becomes Admiral-General in the Royal Danish Navy and knight in the Order of the Elephant.
 May 25–26 – The Battle of Bornholm results in a minor strategic victory to a Danish-Dutch fleet led by Niels Juel against a Swedish fleet.
 26 May – The show trial against Griffenfeld ends with his conviction of all charges against him for simony, bribery, oath-breaking, malversation and lèse-majestéand and treason. He is sentenced to loss of honour, life and estate.
 1 June – The naval Battle of Öland results in a decisive Danish-Dutch victory against a Swedish fleet and Danish naval supremacy that was upheld throughout the war.
 6 June – Griffenfeld is pardoned on the scaffold, at the very moment when the axe was about to descend, and his sentence is commuted to lifelong imprisonment.
 23 June  The County of Schackenborg is established by Otto Didrik Schack, 1st Count of Schackenborg from the manors of Schackenborg, Sødamgård, Solvig and Store Tønde.
 29 June – A Danish fleet transports 14,500 soldiers across the Sound, landing them just south of Helsingborg, and Scania becomes the main battle ground for the remainder of the war.

Undated
 Rømer's determination of the speed of light: Danish physicist Ole Rømer makes the first ever quantitative measurements of the speed of light in Paris.
 Dutch Golden Age painter Jacob Koninck moves to Denmark.

Births

 4 March – Hans Schack, 2nd Count of Schackenborg (died 1719)

Full date unknown
 Christian Thomsen Carl, naval officer (died 1713)

Deaths 

 1 January – Abel Cathrine, courtier and favorite of the queen of Denmark (born c. 1626)
 27 February – Hans Schack, noble and commander-in-chief of the Danish army (born 1608)
 5 March – Abel Schrøder, woodcarver (born c. 1602)

References

 
Denmark
Years of the 17th century in Denmark
Denmark
1670s in Denmark